Hatch Amendment may refer to:
 The Equal Opportunity to Govern Amendment (2003)
 The Protection of Pupil Rights Amendment (1978)
 Either of two proposed Human Life Amendments:
 The Hatch Amendment of 1981
 The Hatch-Eagleton Amendment of 1983